Rudolf Burger (born 21 July 1934) is a Swiss former footballer who played in the 1950s and 1960s. He played mainly as a forward, but also as a defender.

Football career
Burger first played for Nordstern Basel and then for Cantonal Neuchatel, but after just half a year he returned to Nordstern. Both teams played in the Nationalliga B (the second tier of Swiss football).

Burger joined FC Basel's first team for their 1957–58 season under the Austrian trainer Rudi Strittich. After five test games Burger played his domestic league debut for his new club in the home game at the Landhof on 25 August 1957 as Basel played against Winterthur. He scored his first goal for the club in the same game as Basel won the game. In fact Burger scored a hat-trick and Basel  won 8–1.

Between the years 1957 and 1959 Burger played a total of 65 games for Basel scoring a total of 21 goals. 38 of these games were in the Nationalliga A, three in the Swiss Cup and 24 were friendly games. He scored 11 goals in the domestic league, one in the cup and the other nine were scored during the test games.

After his time with Basel Burger moved on to play for Grasshopper Club and for Biel-Bienne.

References

Sources
 Die ersten 125 Jahre. Publisher: Josef Zindel im Friedrich Reinhardt Verlag, Basel. 
 Verein "Basler Fussballarchiv" Homepage

FC Nordstern Basel players
FC Basel players
Neuchâtel Xamax FCS players
Grasshopper Club Zürich players
Swiss men's footballers
Association football defenders
Association football forwards
1934 births
Living people